The 1943 Victorian state election was held in the Australian state of Victoria on Saturday 12 June 1943 to elect 65 members of the state's Legislative Assembly.

Background

Country Party unity
At the time of the election, the Country Party was in the process of repairing a split which had taken place in December 1937 after federal MP John McEwen was expelled from the state branch of the party. The splinter group which supported McEwen had formed the Liberal Country Party on 30 March 1938, which contested the 1940 state election as a separate party. By April 1943, the United Country Party and the Liberal Country Party had formed a joint executive, which had unanimously agreed to reunite the parties. Members of the LCP at the time of the election were endorsed and counted as Victorian Country Party candidates separately from the United Country Party, but the unity agreements meant that their seats were counted for Dunstan's UCP.

Results

Legislative Assembly

|}
Notes:
Fourteen seats were uncontested at this election, and were retained by the incumbent parties:
Labor (7): Bendigo, Brunswick, Dundas, Flemington, Geelong, Northcote, Wonthaggi.
Victorian Country (6): Gippsland East, Goulburn Valley, Gunbower, Lowan, Mornington, Upper Goulburn
UAP (1): Kew

See also
Candidates of the 1943 Victorian state election

References

1943 elections in Australia
Elections in Victoria (Australia)
1940s in Victoria (Australia)
June 1943 events